Anna Aleksandrovna Shpyneva (born January 3, 2002) is a Russian ski jumper.

Career 
She has competed at World Cup level since the 2018/19 season, with her best individual result being 10th place in  Nizhny Tagil on 16 March 2019. She won three gold medals at the 2019 Nordic Junior World Ski Championships in Lahti.

On 2 March 2019 she took part in the mixed team, alongside Dmitriy Vassiliev, Evgeni Klimov and Sofia Tikhonova, at the 2019 World Championships, where they took 7th place at the end.

World Championship results

World Cup

Individual starts (11)

References

External links

 

2002 births
Living people
Russian female ski jumpers
Ski jumpers at the 2020 Winter Youth Olympics
Youth Olympic gold medalists for Russia